KBZZ (1270 kHz, "92.5 The Hog") is an AM radio station broadcasting a classic rock format. Licensed to Sparks, Nevada, United States, the station is part of Tom Quinn's Reno Media Group and serves the Reno area. The station is currently owned by Americom Limited Partnership.  The station's studios are located on Matley Lane in East Reno, and its transmitter is located east of Sparks.

History
The station went on the air as KROI on November 1, 1979. On February 11, 1984, the station changed its call sign to KORY, then on March 1, 1985 to KPLY, on March 5, 2001 to KBZZ, on March 15, 2018 to KSGG, and on March 23, 2018 to KZTQ.

KPLY enjoyed great local and regional success while being hosted by long time sports announcer "Bob D." (Robert Dirosario), and his sports sidekick, "Truckee" Mike Leach. Frequent guest Reno sports experts included sportsbook director John Pinto of the Silver Legacy Reno, the late Paul Sonner, who was the owner of Bully's Sports Bars, sportsbook manager Eric Brownlee of the Club Cal Neva, sports handicapping expert and bookmaker Chris Andrews, (who is now the  sportsbook director with The South Point in Las Vegas), and Friday night horse racing coverage and analysis with "Pony" Bob Wilkie. The Bob D. KPLY daily sports morning program offered extensive information on sports and sports wagering for the average fan, and also the more knowledgeable fan.

The Jim Rome syndicated show was a long running staple on KPLY, as was the Sports Fan Radio Network.

Prior to that time, the call letters KBZZ were used by a long-standing news and music station in La Junta, Colorado, now KBLJ.

In early 2001, after adopting the KBZZ call letters and the nickname "The Buzz", the station added Howard Stern in mornings, followed by a local show with Bob Garrison, the syndicated Don and Mike Show and then the syndicated Tom Leykis in late afternoons. Tom Quinn, president of Americom Broadcasting (owner of KBZZ), had selected the "hot talk" format after his success with Stern in Las Vegas. KBZZ immediately became the top-rated AM station in Reno, beating long-time news/talk station KKOH.

However, after a decade of success, a number of factors hurt KBZZ. With Stern's move to satellite radio, Don Geronimo's decision to quit his show and CBS' decision to drop the Tom Leykis syndicated program, those changes severely damaged KBZZ's ratings. Finally on January 14, 2013, the station changed its format to sports, with programming from CBS Sports Radio. Local Reno hosts for sports and chat from 9:00 am to 10:00 am weekdays included Panama and Truckee Mike Leach.

On July 25, 2016, KBZZ changed again from sports to progressive talk, branded as "96.1 & 1270 AM The Buzz".

On March 15, 2018, KBZZ changed calls to KSGG (with the KBZZ calls moving to Quinn's 1230 AM), coinciding with the announcement that 93.7's variety hits format would move to 1270 and 96.1 the following Monday, March 26. On March 23, 2018, KSGG changed call letters to KZTQ and launched the "Bob FM" variety hits format three days later. The adult hits "Bob FM" format was first broadcast in Reno on Quinn's 97.3 FM frequency, which is now home to Reno's top-rated country radio station KOLC, called "Ten Country."

On September 13, 2019, KBZZ and KZTQ exchanged call letters, formats, and associated translators: Bob FM and the KZTQ call letters moved to 1230 AM but kept its 96.1 and 96.9 FM translators, while 92.5 FM (nominally a repeater of KRNO-HD2), which had been airing a classic hip-hop format, flipped to sports talk as 92.5 The Game, as an affiliate of the BetR Network. On September 9, 2020, the station flipped to oldies as Oldies 92.5.

On April 2, 2021, KBZZ flipped to classic rock, branded as "92.5 The Hog".

FM translators
While for all intents and purposes, K223AL and K245DC are translators of KBZZ.

References

External links
FCC History Cards for KBZZ

BZZ (AM)
Sparks, Nevada
Radio stations established in 1979
1979 establishments in Nevada
Classic rock radio stations in the United States